Joanna Haartti (born 14 April 1979) is a Finnish actress. She is best known for her theatrical work, but has also appeared in several films and on television.

Overview
Haartti graduated from a theatrical Masters program at the Helsinki Theatre Academy in 2008.

Haartti's best known roles are Sylvia in the Finnish National Theatre's production of Rakkaudesta minuun [For Love of Me] (2006), Turku City Theatre's , a musical (2007), the  production of Näytät vieraalta rakas [You Look Strange, Love] (2009), Marion in the Finnish National Theatre's Kristuksen Morsiamessa [The Bride of Christ] in 2010, and in the lead role as Billy Tipton in Soita minulle Billy [Call me Billy] at Theatre Jurka in 2011 and again at the 2012 Helsinki Festival. In addition, she has appeared in the films A Man's Work (2007), Prinsessa (2010), Hiljaisuus [Silence] (2011), and as the lead in Do I Have to Take Care of Everything?, an Oscar nominated short live film. On television, Haarati appeared in the 2011 season of Putous [Comedy Combat] and as one of the two leads in the television series  [Ghostwriter].

Personal life
Currently Haartti is in a partner relationship with the actress Minna Haapkylä.

Filmography
A Man's Work (2007)
Prinsessa (2010)
Hella W (2011)
Risto (2011)
Hiljaisuus (2011)
Do I Have to Take Care of Everything? (2012), nominated in 2013 for an Academy Award for Short Film (Live Action)
Fatima (2013)
Haamukirjoittaja (2015)
Armi elää! (2015)
The Happiest Day in the Life of Olli Mäki (2016)
Tove (2020)

References

External links

1979 births
21st-century Finnish actresses

Finnish film actresses
Finnish stage actresses
Finnish television actresses
Lesbian actresses
Finnish lesbian actresses
Living people